Cy Whittaker's Ward is a 1917 American silent drama film directed by Ben Turbett and starring William Wadsworth, Shirley Mason and W.H. Burton.

Cast
 William Wadsworth as Captain Cy Whittaker
 Shirley Mason as Emily Thomas
 W.H. Burton as Herman Atkins
 Carter B. Harkness as Richard Thomas
 Mary Elizabeth Forbes as Phoebe Daws
 Emily Lorraine as Sarah Oliver
 Leslie Hunt as Ase
 Wallis Clark as Bailey
 Ed Bunnell as Tad
 George O'Donnell as Lem
 Hugh Gillen as Buddy
 Edward M. Favor as Eben 
 Justus D. Barnes as Simmons 
 George Bradley as Josiah

References

Bibliography
 Marina Dahlquist & Joel Frykholm. The Institutionalization of Educational Cinema: North America and Europe in the 1910s and 1920s. Indiana University Press, 2020.

External links
 

1917 films
1917 drama films
1910s English-language films
American silent feature films
Silent American drama films
American black-and-white films
Films directed by Ben Turbett
Edison Studios films
1910s American films